The Amorous Adventures of Moll Flanders is a 1965 British historical comedy film directed by Terence Young and starring Kim Novak, Richard Johnson, and Angela Lansbury. It is based on the 1722 novel Moll Flanders by Daniel Defoe.

Plot

Summary 
In 18th century England, an orphan, Moll Flanders, grows up to become a servant for the town's mayor, who has two grown sons. Moll both seduces and is seduced by the eldest son before being abandoned by him and marrying the younger son, a drunken fool who dies, making her a young widow.

Moll is employed by Lady Blystone to be a servant. She meets a bandit, Jemmy, who mistakes her for the lady of the house and begins to woo her, pretending to be a sea captain. Moll rebuffs the advances of the actual Mrs. Blystone's husband, only to be sacked from her job when they are spotted together.

A banker marries Moll but on their wedding night she flees from him when a gang of thieves (Jemmy and cohorts) appear once more. She chases after Jemmy, eventually ending up in a town and beginning her life of thievery. Moll ends up in jail and finds Jemmy there as well. Their executions are at hand when the banker, finding her there, dies of a sudden heart attack from surprise. As the banker's only inheritor and now a wealthy widow, Moll buys "freedom" (in the form of transportation) for herself, her true love, and her friends, and she and Jemmy have a shipboard wedding on their way to America.

Early life 
As a child, Moll lives in an orphanage but aspires to be a "gentlewoman". The story jumps a dozen years and Moll is one of the servants to a wealthy family. Moll assimilates to the family and acquires the traits of a gentlewoman.

Both of the sons of the family become enamored of Moll, and she initially is attracted to the older brother. He promises her wealth and marriage while they make love in the hay shed. The younger brother becomes jealous and instigates a fight with his older brother. As their relationship progresses, the older brother gives Moll gold as reciprocation for their continued physical relationship. She counts the gold nightly.

One day, two thieves on horseback come across Moll while she bathes naked in a pond. They search for her purse but there is none, then attempt to steal her lace, before she notices them. Her screams alert the younger brother nearby, who fires his pistol, chasing the thieves away.

The younger brother proposes to Moll, much to his parents' dismay. At first, Moll does not want to accept the proposal, and she turns to the older brother for help. He, however, pushes her to accept, arguing that their past relationship cannot come to light and that she might already be pregnant, which would cause problems for her if she was not married. Reluctantly, Moll agrees to the younger brother's marriage proposal, and they are wed.

Post-Married Life 
The younger brother is a poor husband to Moll, and she is miserable for the entire marriage. He also turns out to be a drunken fool, who eventually dies after falling from his carriage into a pond. His death leaves Moll destitute, as all of his wealth reverts to his parents because she didn't have any children with him.

Now a poor widow, Moll begins to look for work. She meets and becomes the servant of Mrs. Blystone, and she moves to London to live in the Blystone townhouse. On her carriage ride to the city, Moll meets a banker, a widower, who also lives in London. The same two thieves from earlier in the film appear, plotting to hold up carriages travelling along the road. The thieves pretend to have been in a carriage accident, forcing Moll's carriage to stop before demanding money and valuables from the passengers. Moll pretends to be pregnant to avoid being robbed. The thieves, not recognizing Moll and believing her to be a pregnant widow, extend mercy to her and take very little from the group. However, one of the thieves takes a hatbox belonging to Moll's employer, and labelled as the property of Mrs. Blystone, leading the thieves to believe that Moll is the wealthy Mrs. Blystone.

Reaching London, the banker follows Moll to the Blystone house, and expresses concern for Moll's safety as she is travelling alone and also as she will spend the night alone in the house. He convinces Moll to allow him to accompany her for the night, becoming extremely angry when she suggests that it would be improper, causing her to relent and agree to let him stay. The banker uses the same technique when Moll expresses discomfort at the idea of sharing a bed with him. During the night, the two become drunk and sleep together. The banker leaves early the next morning, but is caught by the Blystones. Later, realizing that the banker has left a ring by her bedside, Moll writes him a note and goes to his house to deliver it, only to discover the banker ill in bed. He rejects the note and the ring.

Meanwhile, the thieves plot to woo the young "Mrs. Blystone" (i.e., Moll) in order to gain her fortune. At the same time, the Blystones privately discuss their own financial predicament, as Mr. Blystone reveals to his wife that he is not really a count. While the Blystones are away one day, one of the thieves, Jemmy, in disguise, comes to the Blythstone estate under the guise of returning the stolen hatbox. Believing Jemmy to be a rich sea captain, Moll flirts with him as the Blystone servant before attempting to disguise herself as Mrs. Blystone to fool Jemmy. She changes into one of Mrs. Blystone's dresses, and Jemmy does not realize that the person he believes to be Mrs. Blystone is actually a servant. He invites Moll to meet him for dinner later, and Moll happily accepts. The Blystones return as Jemmy is leaving the house, and they believe him to be a man inquiring about their mortgage whom Moll turned away from the estate.

Later on their date, Moll (as "Mrs. Blystone") and Jemmy (as the "captain") are eating dinner, when Jemmy steps away for a moment to borrow money from his colleague, and Moll is approached by several men. Jemmy returns to find Moll being hassled by the men and he starts a fight, which spreads to the rest of the bar. After the date, Moll is caught returning home in Mrs. Blystone's dress by Mr. Blystone, who attempts to blackmail her with sex in exchange for his silence, an offer Moll angrily refuses.

Moll and Jemmy continue on another date wherein Jemmy leads Moll on a tour of a ship he pretends is his. As they continue to talk about the "captain's" work, Jemmy leads Moll to believe that he owns five ships. They have dinner together on the ship, and they attempt to have sex, though their antics are frequently interrupted by Jemmy's thief colleague. They are interrupted once more when the ship accidentally becomes untied from the dock and begins to drift to sea. Following this chaos, Moll goes home after sharing a kiss with Jemmy.

On another date, Jemmy takes Moll to the fair and a ball, where they dance. Moll finally reveals to Jemmy that she is not Mrs. Blystone and is, in fact, a poor servant. Jemmy is so enraged that he storms out of the ball. They argue, and Jemmy accidentally reveals to Moll that he was also lying about his wealth and status in order to marry rich. They yell at and insult each other before kissing and reconciling by talking about their shared dream of marrying into wealth. They spend the night together, but in the morning, Jemmy is gone, leaving Moll with only a note. He returns soon after following a change of heart, but only to say goodbye and leave again.

Moll returns to the Blystone estate, where Mr. Blystone continues to attempt to seduce Moll. After Mrs. Blystone leaves the house one night for an event, Mr. Blystone stays behind, bursting into Moll's bedroom pretending to chase a rat. When Moll shows no patience for him, he feigns illness before attempting to force himself on Moll. A chase and fight ensue. Mr. Blystone manages to pin Moll onto her bed, but Mrs. Blystone, who had suspected her husband's adultery and had only pretended to leave, breaks into the room in anger. Believing Moll to have been a part of the adultery, Mrs. Blystone fires her and banishes her from the estate.

Criminal career 
Following her expulsion from the Blystone estate, Moll finds the banker again, and they are hastily married by a drunk priest.

During a less than earth shaking evening with the banker, now her husband of convenience, Moll looks to the window into the night to see Jemmy and his gang of bandits causing a ruckus below. At the sight of her true love, Moll calls out his name and runs out to join them, effectively running out on the banker. Jemmy takes her to live with the Governess, a con-woman he has associated with for a while. It is shortly after this Moll starts up her criminal career as a means of making her own way and paying for room and board, pawning stolen silver with The Governess. She begins apprehensively, taking a silver cup from the street and working her way up to stealing fabrics off store shelves with a hook lined cloak. As she learns new tricks and tips on how to steal and not get caught, Moll eventually develops a taste for the con world and even grows to enjoy it, taking pleasure in the costumes she adorns. In one specific encounter, she is dressed like a young Spanish woman, complete with a red dress and brown wig. As she takes a ride in a carriage with a nobleman, she seduces him to the point of not noticing the several small items she takes off his body, including a brooch and gold ring. During their criminal career, both Moll and Jemmy are good at evading the law. However, in a series of unfortunate events involving the clocktower chiming and inattentiveness, Moll, Jemmy, Jemmys' 'assistant' and The Governess are carried off to Newgate Prison to eventually be hanged for their crimes.

Redemption 
The banker finds his wife in prison to be executed and immediately dies of a heart attack.

Cast

 Kim Novak – Moll Flanders
 Claire Ufland – Young Moll
 Richard Johnson – Jemmy 
 Angela Lansbury – Lady Blystone 
 Leo McKern – Squint 
 Vittorio De Sica – The Count 
 George Sanders – The Banker 
 Lilli Palmer – Dutchy 
 Peter Butterworth – Grunt 
 Noel Howlett – Bishop 
 Dandy Nichols – Orphanage Superintendent 
 Cecil Parker – The Mayor 
 Barbara Couper – The Mayor's wife 
 Daniel Massey – Elder Brother 
 Derren Nesbitt – Younger Brother 
 Ingrid Hafner – Elder Sister 
 June Watts – Younger Sister 
 Anthony Dawson – Officer of Dragoons 
 Judith Furse – Miss Glowber 
 Richard Wattis – Jeweller
 Hugh Griffith – Prison Governor

Faithfulness to Defoe's text

Plot 
Instead of numerous husbands and lovers, Moll has far fewer in this film adaptation. There is also no appearance of any children in this film, whereas in the book Moll had many children with her husbands and lovers. One of the biggest variances in the movie versus the original book is the lack of Moll Flanders' adventures to America before her escape from jail. This includes a largely important subplot in the book where Moll has a marital relationship to her half-brother (unbeknownst to them both) in Virginia and discovers her mother alive and well, living with him. Through her mother, Moll discovers that she and her husband are blood related, and this issue of incest plagues Moll in the book to severe sickness and her eventual return to England.

Themes

Innocence 
At the beginning of the movie, Moll is depicted as a seductress who is looking to better her standing in the world through an advantageous marriage. This conflicts with the original depiction of Moll within Defoe's book, which has her start out with a childlike innocence towards sex and the manipulations of men. It is the older brother that is the seducer/corrupter in the book. It is due to the combination of his manipulations, and Moll's inflated sense of pride in her appearance, that results in their relationship. "It is true, I had my Head full of Pride, but knowing nothing of the Wickedness of the times, I had not one Thought of my own Safety or of my Virtue about me. ..." Moll's ability to seduce men evolves over time, and out of necessity after being widowed or abandoned multiple times, rather than being an inherent aspect of her personality as the movie suggests.

Penitence 
In the movie, after successfully buying their freedom, Moll, Jemmy, and several other Newgate inmates board a ship for America and to a fresh start. Jemmy and Moll are wed and it appears that all lessons are learned and penitence is considered. However, Moll and Jemmy are back to their thieving and conniving ways, stealing a pocket watch off one of the crewmen while their wedding ceremony is taking place, making it known that despite their time spent in prison, no lessons have been learned. This coincides with the lack of spiritual nature in the film, which is a major aspect of the book.

In Defoe's book, Moll is led to repentance during her time in Newgate when she sees Jemmy in jail, and reflects upon how her actions have harmed others. She confesses her sins, and an abridged version of her life story, to a minister that visits her while she is in jail. It is her act of confession and penitence that persuades the minister to speak on her behalf for her freedom. In the movie it is the inherited fortune from her deceased husband that allows her to buy her way out of prison, but in the book it is her penitence that grants her freedom from Newgate, allowing her the chance to turn her life around in America. She lives out the rest of her life in America with her husband Jemmy, stating that "we resolve to live out the remainder of our years in sincere penitence for the wicked lives we have lived."

Moll's Independence 
In the original text, Moll is shown as trying to gain her own independence. From a young age she mentions she wants to be a 'gentlewoman,' not knowing the word's true meaning (prostitute), thinking that she would be providing for herself through honest work. Throughout the text, she attempts to gain social status and wealth through various marriages and cons, all of which end up failing in the end. She then turns to stealing in order to gain wealth, but is eventually caught. She then repents her sins and convinces a minister of this, leading to her being released and sent to the Colonies with her Lancashire husband. Once in the Colonies, Moll learns that her mother left her a plantation, which her son oversees for her. In the end, Moll and her husband (Jemmy) return to London to live out their final years, using the inheritance which Moll's mother left her and the money her son makes on the plantation. This sets Moll up as a very independent female character because she and her husband profit off of what comes from Moll's side and her inheritance. Instead of Moll being reliant on her husband's money, which was the norm of the time period, she instead provides funds for their mutual growth and life.

In the film, Moll's independence is fairly similar to her independence in the text. She wants from a young age to be someone who provides for herself. As a result, she attempts to woo several men who she believes to be very wealthy so she can marry them and live comfortably. Each attempt goes horribly wrong. She eventually resorts to stealing to try to make money for herself. This is not that different from the book but when Moll gets caught, she is not released because of her repentance. She is released because her current husband sees her and dies from shock, leaving Moll with an inheritance which she uses to buy herself and several other prisoners their freedom. She and the released prisoners then make their way on a ship heading to the Colonies where Moll then marries Jemmy who she marries for love. They both then go right back to stealing instead of repenting for their sins at the end of the film.

Production

Rival Projects
There had been several attempts to film the novel of the years. In 1953 Umberto Scarpelli announced he would film it in Italy. In 1956 Gina Lollobrigida was reportedly working on an adaptation.

In 1954 Vanessa Brown, who had played the Girl in The Seven Year Itch on Broadway, announced she would star in a film version to be produced by her husband, Richard Franklin, and based on a script by Roland Kibee. Later Marcel Hellman of Associated British was going to produce a version based on this, starring Richard Todd as the highwayman with Michael Anderson to direct.

In 1961 John Osborne wrote a script as a vehicle for Sophia Loren.

Development
Interest in an adaptation of the novel was re-activated by the success of Tom Jones. In February 1964 it was announced J. Arthur Rank had purchased the script off Roland Kibee for $125,000 and a percentage of the profits from Dr Robert Alan Franklin, a Hollywood plastic surgeon, and his partner in the property, British producer R. Burry Brush. They had held the rights to the script for a decade and at one stage the film as almost to be made at 20th Century Fox but the deal fell over. Interest in the property was revived by Tom Jones. Rank made a deal with Paramount whereby Rank would provide $1 million of the budget while Paramount provided $1.4 million. Marcel Hellman, who helped negotiate the deal, was to be executive producer

Later that month it was announced Terence Young would direct and Denis Canan was rewriting the script. The film would be a coproduction between Hellman's Excelsior Productions and Young's Winchester Productions.

In May 1964 Paramount announced they would make the film with Marcel Hellman producing and Terence Young directing. Roland Kibee and Denis Canan wrote the script; the dialogues contain Americanisms, such as liquors instead of spirits.

The lead role was originally considered for Diane Cilento, who had gathered critical acclaim from her role in Tom Jones, but she had other commitments. Had Cilento appeared in the film, Sean Connery would have played the male lead.

Kim Novak's casting was announced in August 1964.

Richard Johnson was selected to play the highwayman over 140 other actors seen for the role.

After filming ended, Novak and Johnson married in March 1965.

Filming locations
The difficulty of finding authentic locations meant the setting of the story was moved from the seventeenth to the eighteenth century to use Queen Anne buildings. The film's period adviser was Vyvyan Holland, son of Oscar Wilde. (He performed a similar role on Tom Jones.)

The productions filmed mainly in Kent at Chilham – the square doubles as the village where Moll grew up, Chilham Castle features as the Mayor's House and St Mary's Church is used for the scenes where Moll marries Younger Brother. In September 1964 a fire broke out at Chilham Castle.  Some of the other scenes were shot in Castle Lodge, a Tudor house in the centre of Ludlow, Shropshire.

Reception
Young said "I think it's a damn good film despite the critics." He added that there were "fifty nine cuts" made for the US release "which I suppose were made in the interests of American morality."

Box office
The Amorous Adventures of Moll Flanders was one of the 13 most popular films in the UK in 1965.

Kim Novak took a three-year break from motion pictures after this film, though her 1965 scenes in Eye of the Devil were deleted and reshot with Deborah Kerr. She returned to the screen in 1968's The Legend of Lylah Clare.

Further reading
 Parke, Catherine N. "Adaptations of Defoe's Moll Flanders".  pp. 52–69. Robert Mayer (ed. and introd.). Eighteenth-Century Fiction on Screen. Cambridge, England: Cambridge UP, 2002. xiv, 226 pp.
 Tibbetts, John C., and James M. Welsh, eds. The Encyclopedia of Novels Into Film (2nd ed. 2005) pp 132–133.

References

External links

1965 films
1960s English-language films
1960s historical comedy films
British historical comedy films
Films based on British novels
Films directed by Terence Young
Films scored by John Addison
Films set in the 18th century
Films set in London
Paramount Pictures films
1960s British films